The Let Me Entertain You Tour was the eleventh concert tour by British recording artist, Robbie Williams. The tour began in March 2015 in Europe and continued into Asia and Australasia, with over 40 shows. The tour grossed $27.1 million with 235,100 tickets sold.

Background
Shortly after the birth of his son, Williams announced the tour via YouTube. The video displays the pop singer walking around a neighbourhood in Los Angeles. He recites an updated, spoken word version of his hit, "Let Me Entertain You". Williams exclaimed the tour will visit new places or areas where he has not toured in a long time. The announcement was shortly followed with a posting on his official website. In May 2015, Williams performed in Israel for the first time, before 50,000 fans at Hayarkon Park in Tel Aviv. He began the performance wearing devil horns. In the second half of the show, he donned a kilt. Underneath he wore tight black briefs with a tiger on the front. The shows in Paris, France were recorded for a live album which is available on Williams' official website.

Opening acts
Baskery (Europe, Leg 1)
Lawson (Australasia)
Avalanche City 
Ninet Tayeb (Tel Aviv)

Setlist
The following setlist is obtained from the concerts held in Madrid and Barcelona, March 2015. This setlist does not represent all concerts during the tour.
"Video Introduction" (contains elements of "O Fortuna")
"Let Me Entertain You"
"Rock DJ"
"We Will Rock You" / "I Love Rock n Roll"
"Monsoon"
"Tripping"
"Bodies" (contains excerpts from "Royals")
"The Road to Mandalay" (performed with Baskery)
"Video Sequence"
"Minnie The Moocher"
"Swing Supreme" (contains excerpts from "I Will Survive")
"Ignition (Remix)" / "Shout"
"Motherfucker" (contains excerpts from "Twinkle, Twinkle, Little Star")
"Better Man"
"Video Sequence"
"Radio" (contains elements of "Push It")
"No Regrets" 
"Come Undone" (contains excerpts from "I Still Haven't Found What I'm Looking For")	
"Candy"
"Feel"
"Millennium" (contains excerpts from "99 Problems")
"Kids" (contains elements of "Back in Black")
Encore
"Bohemian Rhapsody"
"Angels"

Tour dates

Festivals and other miscellaneous performances

Pinkpop Festival
Rockwave Festival
Bråvalla Festival
Tinderbox Music Festival
TW Classic
Rock in Roma
Celebration of the Tenth Anniversary of the Reign of Prince Albert II 
Paléo Festival
Lucca Summer Festival
Hard Rock Rising
Spirit of Burgas
Sziget Festival

Cancellations and rescheduled shows

Box office score data

External links
Robbie Williams Official Website

References

Robbie Williams concert tours
2015 concert tours